The Pumpkin Roll is an annual event since 1969 in Chagrin Falls, Ohio involving rolling pumpkins down a hill at night. Historically, at the conclusion of the roll, the students attend a big party, leaving most of them either hungover or still drunk at school the next day.

History
The "Pumpkin Roll" began as a class prank undertaken by the Chagrin Falls High School class of 1969. The students took 69 pumpkins and rolled them down Grove Hill (part of Main Street in Chagrin Falls, Ohio). The two conductors of this prank were Steve and Allen Leach. Classmate Alvin "Beanie" Smith was the main transport for the pumpkins, utilizing the dump truck he owned. The Leaches' younger brother and many of his classmates from the class of 1971 advanced and continued the movement. Students from the class of 1972 and 1973 collected pumpkins typically no smaller than a basketball and dumped them out of the backs of their cars and watched them roll down the steep hill. The class of 1976 dumped around 900 pumpkins.

These students started a tradition that has been carried for over 46 years since. According to the de facto rules of the event, it is planned largely by the senior class of Chagrin Falls High School, with help from the juniors. The event is held on a day determined by the Chagrin Falls Police Department. Underclassmen are not invited to participate. As a result, the Pumpkin Roll has become a bonding experience for the junior and senior classes. They traditionally smash open the pumpkins and slide down the hill on a chosen night around Halloween. The event initially began as a "dump and run" operation but has currently evolved into a much more elaborate setup, as students sled down the hills on recycling bins, baby pools, and other objects that could be used as sleds. Police interference has had little effect over the years. The event often ends with some, typically minor, injuries to participants. 

Pumpkins are typically stolen from houses surrounding the area. Juniors and seniors go out the nights before the actual event to steal them. This act has been dubbed by the locals as "pumpkining". When caught pumpkining, students have been charged with counts of theft. The record for most stolen and rolled pumpkins belongs to the Class of 2018 with an estimated 2,300 pumpkins. The current record for largest pumpkin stolen is held by a pumpkin weighing in at 776.5 pounds. The pumpkin was stolen by Juniors at the time, all from the class of 2009.

During the Pumpkin Roll of 2008, Solon resident Robert Bowen was talking with a police officer when he was struck from behind by a sled travelling down the hill. Bowen fell, hitting his head on the concrete, and had to be transported to a hospital. The incident left him unconscious and on life support. This was expected to affect the future of the Pumpkin Roll, though there proved to be no changes the following years.

The Class of 2012's Roll had no arrests and no injuries, a feat compared to Rolls of years prior.

A 2017 documentary produced by R43 Limited in Chagrin Falls and titled Grove Hill: A True Story chronicles the evolution of the annual Pumpkin Roll.

No roll is planned in 2020.

Coverage
Every year, footage from the event airs on Cleveland's local news stations. Footage from the 2004 Pumpkin Roll shot by former student Ryan Luby appeared on ESPN as number eight on the “Not Top 10 Plays of the Week”. This drew national attention towards Chagrin Falls, which is a small, quaint village with a population of roughly 4,000.

External links

Sources
 Chagrin Falls Alumni Association: History
 Sun News Report from 1997
 WKYC TV station coverage
 'Countdown with Keith Olbermann for October 19, 2005 -Features mention of Pumpkin Roll
 Cleveland Plain Dealer Describes injury to man in 2008
 The Chagrin Falls pumpkin roll aims for the silver screen
 WATCH: Students smash pumpkins, slide down Grove Hill at the annual Chagrin Falls Pumpkin Roll

Festivals in Ohio
Cuyahoga County, Ohio